Harry Young may refer to:

Harry Young (American football) (1893–1977), member of the College Football Hall of Fame
Harry Young (cyclist), Canadian cyclist
Harry Young (mayor), mayor of San Jose, California
Harry Young (rugby league), rugby league footballer who played in the 1920s 
Harry Dove Young (1867–1944), vigneron and politician in South Australia
Harry Young (socialist), British socialist activist
Harry Young, who took part in the 1932 Young Brothers Massacre

See also
Henry Young (disambiguation)
Harold Young (disambiguation)
Harrison Young (1930–2005), actor